Lynda Keane (born 1950), is a British-born Australian producer, film and television actress and acting coach. 

Keane guest starred on numerous television series during the 1960s and 70s, most notably Bellbird, Homicide, Number 96, The Box, and Prisoner.

She is an acting tutor, who founded her own talent school, called the Lynda Keane Talent School with her husband Greg Anderson as well as the affiliated Keane Kids Management, Keane Kids Studio and Lynda Keane Studios. Among its students have included Brooke Mikey Anderson, Brett Blewitt, Brett Climo, Alyssa Jane Cook, Jamie Croft, Bree Desborough, Gavin Harrison, Matthew Krok, Toni Pearen, Paul Begaud, Charli Robinson, Ben Unwin, Kym Valentine, Nikki Webster, Kristy Wright, Dominic, Sebastian and Rebekah Elmaloglou.

Early acting career

Lynda Keane began her career as a child actor in London, performing professionally since she was 15 months old, before her family emigrated to Australia when she was ten. Her parents, at that time, owned and operated one of London's leading talent
schools.  

She continued her career there starring in the 1960 children's series The Adventures of the Terrible Ten and its sequel The Ten Again in 1963. She also guest starred on Bellbird, Hey You and Homicide between 1967 and 1969, appearing on the latter series several times.

In 1970, she married her childhood sweetheart musician Greg Anderson. Keane also began to have a more active career during the 1970s with roles on The Rovers (1970), Number 96 (1972) and several appearances on Division 4 and Matlock Police.

She played a regular role in serial The Box as Barbie Gray  from February 1974 until early 1975. She had a minor role in the television movie The Hotline (1974) as well as one-time appearances on King's Men (1976) and The Outsiders (1976).

Talent school
She began to cut back on acting to concentrate on her career as a producer and acting teacher. In 1975, with her husband Greg Anderson, she opened "Gala Productions" and the "Lynda Keane Talent School" a year later. Her success with the school would also lead to the Keane Kids Management, the Keane Kids Studio and the Lynda Keane Studios. In November 1979, she traveled to New York with a group of her students, whose ages ranged between 8 and 16 years old, where they performed songs, dancing and acting performances to raise money for refugees. Keane, according to the Sydney Morning Herald, hoped to raise as much as $50,000.

Acting roles

Keane was cast in Prisoner as  Denise "Blossom" Crabtree also in 1979. Her character was introduced as the mistress of Fred Ferguson, estranged husband of prison inmate Monica Ferguson. This was followed by a guest role in Neighbours in 1998.

Keane did not make an acting appearance for 15 years. During this time she and her partner Anderson helped train many child actors of the 1980s and 90s through their talent school. In 1997, she returned to acting with minor roles in the drama film The Castle and the police drama Blue Heelers. From 2000 to 2005, she also made television guest appearances on Stingers, The Secret Life of Us, Short Cuts and MDA.

Filmography

Film

Television

References

External links

Living people
Australian film actresses
Australian soap opera actresses
Actresses from Sydney
20th-century Australian actresses
21st-century Australian actresses
1950 births